2021 in philosophy

Events
January 7-16: The American Philosophical Association held its annual Eastern Division meeting virtually. 
February 22-27: The American Philosophical Association held its annual Central Division meeting virtually. 
April 5-10: The American Philosophical Association held its annual Pacific Division meeting virtually. 
Ben Goertzel is awarded the 2021 Barwise Prize.
Peter Singer wins the 2021 Berggruen Prize.
R. Lanier Anderson, Jennifer Lackey, and Roslyn Weiss are awarded Guggenheim Fellowships in philosophy.
Jill Lepore is presented a Hannah Arendt Award.
Béatrice Longuenesse receives a Hegel Prize.
Martha Nussbaum is awarded the 2021 Holberg Prize.
Frances Egan is awarded the 2021 Jean Nicod Prize.
Anya Plutynski is awarded the Lakatos Award.
Klaus Theweleit is awarded the Theodor W. Adorno Award.

Deaths
January 8 - John Corcoran, American logician, philosopher, mathematician, and historian of logic.
January 9 - Margaret Morrison, Canadian philosopher who worked in the philosophy of science.
February 20 - Richard Boyd
March 6 - Jude Patrick Dougherty
March 23 - Edmund Gettier, American philosopher best known for the Gettier problem.
April 5 - Jon Michael Dunn
April 7 - Kai Nielsen, American and Canadian moral philosopher, naturalist, and atheist.
April 21 - Donald W. Sherburne
April - Katherine Hawley
April 29 - Andrew J. Reck
May 9 - Jacques Bouveresse, French philosopher.
May 23 - Frithjof Bergmann, German philosopher.
June 8 - Joseph Margolis
June 22 - Zbigniew Pełczyński, Polish-British political philosopher and academic.
June 25 - Oliva Blanchette
July 11 - Van A. Harvey
July 13 - Jorge J. E. Gracia, Cuban-born American philosopher specializing in metaphysics, epistemology, the history of philosophy, and race/ethnicity/nationality.
July 25 - Bob Moses,  American educator and civil rights activist. 
August 8 - Sarah Broadie, British philosopher specializing in ancient philosophy, metaphysics, and ethics.
August 23 - Jean-Luc Nancy, French philosopher.
September 11 - Abimael Guzmán
September 20 - Charles W. Mills
October 22 - Lilli Alanen
November 9 - Linda López McAlister
November 13 - Gilbert Harman
December 15 - bell hooks
December 31 - Michael Inwood

References

2021-related lists
Philosophy by year
21st-century philosophy